Gajedi Taal is a lake in the Gajedi VDC of southern Nepal located close to Lumbini.

Location
Gajedi Taal is in the countryside; the village name is Danapur (Kuchira) which is a part of Kanchan Rural Municipality (previously Gajedi VDC). To reach Danapur (Kuchira) village, one takes a vehicle from Butwal, the headquarters of Rupandehi district. From there it is approximately 21 kilometers west. After you cross 19 kilometers, turn south at Bansgadhi. It gives pleasant scenario of greenery with natural lake with rare species of birds.

Attractions

Boating

Boating on this lake is becoming popular day by day. Many tourists come here for boating on fresh water and fully enjoy it. There are some people trained in boating who will help you if needed. The people there are inhabitants, and they know everything about Gajedi Taal. Sometimes they scare you with stories of accidental deaths.

Jungle safari

Organizations like Aama Samuha (Mother's group), offer guides and jungle safaris.

Picnic
Another fantastic activity there is picnic. When Gajedi Taal was not popular, it was only the picnic place and people came from far away villages. Nowadays, it is one of the most facilitated picnic spots in the district. The picnic stalls are being developed; in the near future, it will be a popular spot. People as far as Butwal, Bhairahawa come there and picnic.

Sports
The location is good to organize sports like football and cricket. Sometimes, especially in festivals like Dashain, Tihar etc., we can see the sports going on.

Nearby activities

Lausha Taal

Another renowned lake, Lausha Taal, also near Gajedi Taal, is on the way to Gajedi Taal in Lausha village. Lausha Taal is not popular with tourists, but if you visit Gajedi Taal, it is worth visiting Lausha Taal. The location of Lausha Taal is not so straightforward; ask the local people. People there are very polite and generous, so you may not face any problems to find. If you feel hungry, they will invite you for lunch or dinner.

Lumbini
Lumbini, the birthplace of Gautam Buddha, also known as 'The Light of Asia', is one of the most visited places of Nepal and main attraction for national and foreign tourists. Buddha was born in the sixth century B.C. Many tourists from around the world visit Lumbini to see arts, human creativity in beautiful temples, and statues interspersed around the wide green forest.

See also
List of lakes of Nepal

References

Lakes of Lumbini Province